Jess Williamson is an American singer-songwriter based in Los Angeles. Her fourth album, Sorceress, was released on Mexican Summer in May 2020.

Career 
Williamson was born in the suburbs of Dallas, and began playing music while a student at the University of Texas at Austin. She released her first two albums on her own imprint, Brutal Honest: Native State in 2014, and Heart Song in 2016. Following Williamson's move from Austin to Los Angeles, her third album, Cosmic Wink (2018) was released on the label Mexican Summer.

On February 26, 2020, Williamson announced her fourth studio album, Sorceress, and released its first single, "Wind on Tin". Sorceress was released on May 15, 2020, on Mexican Summer and received general praise, with a positive critic score of 74 on review aggregator sites Metacritic and Album of the Year.

In June 2020, Williamson released the single "Pictures of Flowers" with collaborator Hand Habits. National Public Radio's Ann Powers named it her favorite song of 2020.

In July 2022, Williamson announced Plains, a collaboration project with singer-songwriter Katie Crutchfield of Waxahatchee. They released their debut album, I Walked with You a Ways, on October 14, 2022.

Discography

Studio albums 
Native State (2014)
Heart Song (2016)
Cosmic Wink (2018)
Sorceress (2020)
I Walked with You a Ways as Plains (2022)

EPs 
Medicine Wheel/Death Songs (2011)
Texas Blue Digital EP (2022)

References

External links
Official website

Country musicians from Texas
21st-century American musicians
Musicians from Dallas
Year of birth missing (living people)
Living people
University of Texas at Austin alumni
Mexican Summer artists
21st-century American women musicians